Williton railway station in Williton, Somerset, England, was opened by the West Somerset Railway in 1862 and closed by British Rail in 1971. It was reopened in 1976 as a heritage line. The locomotive workshops here are the headquarters of the Diesel and Electric Preservation Group (DEPG).

History

Hence in 1874 a second broad gauge track and associated platform was opened, allowing trains to pass within the station. To enable this, a new road bridge was built at the south end of the station before the loop was opened, but the level crossing next to the platform was left in place.

The railway was operated from its opening by the Bristol and Exeter Railway, which became a part of the Great Western Railway in 1876. The West Somerset Railway remained an independent company until 1922, when it too was absorbed by the Great Western. In 1948, the line became a part of the Western Region of British Railways as a result of nationalisation in 1948, after which in the 1960s the loop line was shortened back towards the original level crossing point.

The station closed on 4 January 1971. On 28 August 1976, a new West Somerset Railway reopened the station. The goods shed and yard have since been adapted for restoring and repairing locomotives and carriages.

Description

The main station building is on the northbound platform, being typical of a Bristol and Exeter Railway stations of the 1860s complete with an Italianate chimney, and next door is a matching small cafe. To the south is the signal box which dates from 1875, the only Bristol and Exeter Railway one still in use, it still operates the signals and overlooks the level crossing at the south end of the station. Beyond this is a small store which dates from 1862, and the road bridge. On the north side of the station building is the goods shed, now used as a diesel heritage visitor centre, and the locomotive workshops.

The opposite platform was built in 1874 (the original broad gauge loading gauge still reflected in the platform's spacing), and has always been the site of a wooden waiting room. Behind this platform is a box hedge garden which is over 100 years old. The original B&ER footbridge was installed towards the south end of the station close to the signal box, but was removed by British Railways in the 1960s, when they shortened the passing loop. A new original GWR footbridge that had previously been in use at Trowbridge railway station, was brought into use on the north side of the main station building on 16 July 2011, so that people can cross to the second platform without having to cross the tracks on the level crossing.

The newspaper kiosk, plate layers hut, signal box, waiting room and east platform and booking office are listed buildings.

Railway workshops

The station is a major site for the WSR's workshops. The former goods shed was converted for use by the DEPG as a locomotive workshop; this has since been supplemented by a purpose-built workshop nearby. At the far end of the station yard is a pre-fabricated building that is used for steam locomotive and coach overhauls by the West Somerset Railway Association, the volunteer supporters of the West Somerset Railway; it was originally erected at Swindon Works in 1899 and is Grade II listed and was donated by Tarmac Ltd following the closure of the works.

Services

References

External links

Williton Station website
West Somerset Railway - Williton station page

West Somerset Railway
Heritage railway stations in Somerset
Railway stations in Great Britain opened in 1862
Railway stations in Great Britain closed in 1971
Railway stations in Great Britain opened in 1976
Former Great Western Railway stations
Grade II listed buildings in West Somerset
Grade II listed railway stations
1862 establishments in England